Darius Florin Brăguși (born 18 June 1993) is a Romanian professional tennis player playing on the ITF Men's Circuit and current member of the Romania Davis Cup Team. On 30 January 2012 he reached his highest ATP singles ranking of 936.

Davis Cup

Singles performances (0–1)

References

External links

1993 births
Living people
Sportspeople from Râmnicu Vâlcea
Romanian male tennis players
21st-century Romanian people